Misunderstood is a 1966 Italian drama film directed by Luigi Comencini. It was entered into the 1967 Cannes Film Festival.

Plot
Duncombe is the UK Consul General in Florence, Italy. He becomes a widower when his two sons, Andrew and Miles, are still children.  Andrew, the elder, apparently reacts with adult maturity to the loss of his mother, looking after little Miles, an attempt to find a way out of such premature heart-crushing loss. Miles constantly blames Andrew for his mischievous behavior but his brother valiantly takes said blame as his personality is that of a grown up, or at least that is what he tries to be. The father, given his mandate, is often absent, both physically and emotionally, especially toward Andrew. It will be at the end that Duncombe will acknowledge his mistakes when finding himself at a father's point of no return.

Cast
 Sir Anthony Quayle as John Duncombe
 Stefano Colagrande as Andrew
 Simone Giannozzi as Miles
 John Sharp as Uncle William
 Adriana Facchetti as Luisa
 Anna Maria Nardini as little girl in a movie theatre
 Silla Bettini as a Judo teacher
 Rino Benini as Casimirio
 Giorgia Moll as Miss Judy
 Graziella Granata as Dora

References

External links
 

1966 films
1966 drama films
Italian drama films
1960s Italian-language films
Films about brothers
Films about death
Films about dysfunctional families
Films about children
Films directed by Luigi Comencini
Films set in Florence
Films produced by Angelo Rizzoli
Films scored by Fiorenzo Carpi
1960s Italian films